Notre-Dame on Fire is a 2022 disaster film based on the Notre-Dame de Paris fire that occurred on 15 April 2019. The film is directed by Jean-Jacques Annaud from a script written by Annaud and Thomas Bidegain. Produced by Pathé Films and TF1 Films Production, it is an international co-production with Italian company Wildside.

Notre-Dame on Fire was released in France on 16 March 2022, by Pathé Distribution in IMAX, Dolby Cinema, and standard formats. In Italy, it was released on 28 March 2022, by Vision Distribution.

Synopsis 
On 15 April 2019, a violent fire broke out in Notre-Dame Cathedral in Paris. Women and men will do everything to save the building and the religious and art treasures stored within.

Cast

Production 

In April 2020, Jean-Jacques Annaud announced that he wanted to make a film about the fire. He explained this choice later: "Obviously, I immediately felt the extraordinary cinematographic merits. Beyond the disaster and the grief, of course, there is precisely the emotion and the spectacle of the fire". The filmmaker had first thought of making a documentary.

Filming began in March 2021 in Bourges. Bourges Cathedral was used for its resemblance to Notre-Dame. The team then began to shoot in the studio at the Cité du Cinéma. A sequence was then shot in mid-April in Versailles, in the Versailles-Château-Rive-Gauche12 station. Sequences were also shot in Amiens Cathedral, whose spire and certain parts of the building are similar to those of Notre-Dame.

The scenes recounting the start of the fire were set in the 13th century framework of the Saint-Étienne cathedral in Sens. In this place, shots were also taken on the forecourt, on the stairs of the towers, and in the nave.

To complete his film, director Annaud called for the recovery of archive footage from the day of the fire:

"I still need the traffic jams that were created by this event, the people singing in the night to cheer on the firefighters who saved the cathedral. I also need testimonies from foreign countries (…) to discuss the planetary event. If you have these images, we would be happy to take advantage of them and put them in the film."

Release 
In February 2022, it was announced that the film would be released in France on March 16, 2022 by Pathé, three years after the fire.  It was then released in Italy on March 28, 2022 by Vision Distribution. It also was released on July 22, 2022 in the United Kingdom by Pathé's British distributor, Warner Bros. Pictures.

Reception

Box office 
On the day of its release in French cinemas, the feature film took 2nd position at the box office ranking of new releases, garnering 41,089 admissions, including 4,771 in preview for 752 copies. In today's releases, it is preceded by the animated film Jujutsu Kaisen 0 and followed by the comedy film Alors on Danse (21,997). The film took 2nd place at the French box office after its first week of release, garnering 388,293 admissions. The film made up part of the top 3 at the box office in the run-up to Printemps du Cinéma 2022. The following week, the film dropped to the 5th place in the French box office with its 108,099 admissions, behind the dramatic comedy film The Kitchen Brigade (119,405) and ahead of the anime Jujutsu Kaisen 0 (78,827). The film maintained this position the following week with an additional 134,038 admissions.

Critical reception 
Based on 15 reviews collected by Rotten Tomatoes, the film received a 87% approval rating, with an average score of 6.5/10. Metacritic, which assigns a normalized rating based on reviews from top mainstream critics, calculated an average score of 64 out of 100 based on five reviews, indicating "generally favorable reviews."

References

External links 
 

2022 films
2022 drama films
2020s disaster films
2020s French-language films
French drama films
French disaster films
French films based on actual events
Italian drama films
Italian disaster films
Disaster films based on actual events
Pathé films
Films directed by Jean-Jacques Annaud
Films scored by Simon Franglen
Films set in 2019
Films set in Paris
Films shot in Île-de-France
Films shot in France
Films with screenplays by Thomas Bidegain
Notre-Dame de Paris
2020s French films